Russula clelandii is a species of fungus in the family Russulaceae. Found in Australia, it was described as new to science in 1987. The fungus fruits on the ground in mixed woodlands of jarrah (Eucalyptus marginata) and karri (E. diversicolor), plants with which it is suspected of forming ectomycorrhizae. Fruitbodies are similar in morphology to the North American species Russula mariae. The specific epithet honours Australian naturalist John Burton Cleland.

See also
List of Russula species

References

External links

clelandii
Fungi described in 1987
Fungi of Australia